Barbie's Cradle was a Filipino alternative rock band, formed in 1998 by the remaining members of Barbie Almalbis' previous band, Hungry Young Poets, and disbanded in 2005 when Almalbis took up a solo career.  The band released three albums, Barbie's Cradle, Music from the Buffet Table, and Playing in the Fields, the last two of which featured lyrics notable for their Christian-oriented content, brought about by personal changes in the life of songwriter Almalbis.

Aside from Almalbis, members over the years included Rommel de la Cruz who played bass throughout the band's existence; drummers Franklin Benitez  and Wendell Garcia, who were part of the band before and after the release of Music from the Buffet Table respectively, and Kakoi Legaspi, who took up a second guitar position just prior to the band's dissolution in 2005.

Origins
The first incarnation, called Hungry Young Poets started as a duo in 1997 by Barbie Almalbis (guitarist, vocalist, and songwriter) and Ricci Gurango (bassist). After releasing their only self-titled album, Franklin Benitez (drummer) would officially complete the trio.

In 1998, Gurango left the band to lead cover band, Little Green Men, before forming MOJOFLY. With Gurango's assertion of rights to the band's name, Almalbis and Benitez would later rename the group, Barbie's Cradle.

Albums and Lineup over the years 
The band's original lineup consisted of Barbie Almalbis on vocals and guitar, Franklin Benitez on drums, and Rommel De La Cruz on Bass.  This was the lineup that performed at a Manila show by Sixpence None The Richer and which recorded the song "Tabing Ilog" to serve as the title song for an afternoon soap opera of the same name.  Soon after, the band would release their Eponymous first album, Barbie's Cradle in late 1999.

Drummer Franklin Benitez would leave the band before the release in 2000 of the band's second album, Music from the Buffet Table.  Some of the tracks on that album were thus performed by Benitez, and some by Wendell Garcia.  That album would be significant for introducing the Christian-themed lyrics that would be Barbie's Cradle's trademark until its disbandment, and of Barbie Almalbis as a solo artist thereafter.

The highly successful trio of Almalbis, De La Cruz, and Garcia, with their now-distinctive spiritually influenced songs, released Playing in the Fields in 2003.

In 2005, Rivermaya guitarist Kakoi Legaspi left that group to become part of Barbie's Cradle.  Almalbis, however, decided to take up a solo career, which meant that no full Barbie's Cradle album would be made with the addition of Legaspi's guitar performance.  The new Barbie's Cradle sound, with Legaspi's contribution, however, can be heard in the "Good Day" track which was released in Barbie: The Singles, a compilation album released in 2005 featuring songs by Hungry Young Poets, Barbie's Cradle, and Almalbis as a solo artist.

After Barbie's Cradle 
The band had one last performance as one of the performers at a benefit concert for the Philippine National Red Cross, in UP Diliman's Bahay ng Alumni.

After Almalbis left the band in 2005 to pursue a solo career, the other members of the group eventually took up positions in other bands.  Rommel De La Cruz would take up the post of bass player in Freestyle, Wendell Garcia became the drummer for Pupil, and Kakoi Legaspi would be one of the founders of Salindiwa.  Franklin Benitez worked with Almalbis again, taking up the drums for Almalbis' later albums as a solo artist.

Discography
1999 - Barbie's Cradle
2000 - Music from the Buffet Table
2003 - Playing in the Fields

Awards and nominations

References

External links
 Online Registry of Filipino Musical Artists and Their Works: Hungry Young Poets
 Online Registry of Filipino Musical Artists and Their Works: Barbie's Cradle
 The Philippine Association of the Record Industry, Inc. (PARI)

Filipino rock music groups
Musical groups from Metro Manila
Musical groups established in 1998
Musical groups disestablished in 2005
Female-fronted musical groups